SHB Da Nang Football Club, simply known as SHB Da Nang, is a Vietnamese professional football club based in Da Nang that plays in the top division in Vietnamese football, V.League 1. 

The club was known as Quang Nam-Da Nang FC prior to the 2007–08 season, when it was bought out by the Saigon-Hanoi Commercial Joint Stock Bank (SHB). The club won its first title in 2009, emerging as 2009 V-League champions and qualifying for the 2010 AFC Champions League. In the same year, they were also champions of the Vietnamese Cup. Adding to these victories, Danang's U-21 team also became champions in 2009 youth championships. The club were champions of the 2012 V-League season.

They currently play their home matches at Hoa Xuan Stadium, a dedicated 20,500 capacity football-specific stadium that opened in 2016.

Players

First-team squad
As of 17 January 2023

Out on loan

Reserves and academy

Out on loan

Former players

   Gastón Merlo
   Nguyễn Rogerio
  Nicolás Hernández
  Krisztián Timár
  Nikolce Klečkarovski
  Eydison
  Mariusz Wysocki

Honours

National competitions
League
V.League 1:
 Winners :        1992, 2009, 2012
 Runners-up :   1987–88, 1990, 1991, 2005, 2013
V.League 2:
 Runners-up : 2000–01
Cup
Vietnamese Super Cup:
 Winners :       2012
 Runners-up :  2009
Vietnamese Cup:
 Winners : 1993, 2009 
 Runners-up :   2013

Other competitions
BTV Cup:
 Winners : 2008

Thiên Long Cup:
 Winners : 2021

Kit suppliers and shirt sponsors

Continental record

1 Balestier withdrew

Season-by-season record

Current coaching staff

Head coach history
Head coaches by Years (2004–present)

References

External links
Official website 

Association football clubs established in 1976
Football clubs in Vietnam
1976 establishments in Vietnam
SHB Da Nang FC